Carey Lake is a lake in Cottonwood County, in the U.S. state of Minnesota.

Carey Lake was named for three brothers who settled there: Harvey, John, and Ralph Carey.

References

Lakes of Minnesota
Lakes of Cottonwood County, Minnesota